Fluker (also Hyde) is an unincorporated community in Tangipahoa Parish, Louisiana, United States. Its ZIP code is 70436.

Notes

Unincorporated communities in Tangipahoa Parish, Louisiana
Unincorporated communities in Louisiana